Noam Friedlander is an author, award-winning scriptwriter, playwright, columnist, interviewer and feature writer. She has written 14 non-fiction books on subjects ranging from sport, religion, entertainment and children's names as well as having over 20 years of experience as a journalist for various broadsheets and magazines.

She also writes scripts for TV and worked on the final UK TV series Dream Team, which was on Sky1, as well as being the Question Writer and working on the production team for the UK version of US show Are You Smarter Than a 5th Grader, which was also shown on Sky1 as Are You Smarter Than a 10-Year-Old.

Screen writing awards

In 2015, Noam was a finalist in The Beverly Hills Film Festival Competition for her script The Red, which was previously a play performed at the Piven Theatre Workshop in Chicago in 2014 under the direction of Joyce Piven. In August 2015, the script for The Red received an 'Honorable Mention' at WilliFest's Screenplay Competition. (WilliFest is also known as Brooklyn's Williamsburg International Film Festival). In October 2015, her script The Red was the winner of the Screenplay Competition at the San Pedro International Film Festival. In June 2016, The Red was a quarter-finalist at the Austin Revolution Film Festival. In August 2016, the script for The Red was a ‘Preliminary Finalist’ at the 2016 Creative World Awards. The same script was also a 'second rounder' at the Austin Film Festival. In October 2016, The Red was a runner-up at the Denver Film Festival. Finally, in January 2017, her script The Red was the winner of the Best Historical Screenplay Competition at the Mediterranean Film Festival Winter Edition.

Other

She is daughter of Rabbi Albert Friedlander.

Her 2005 book What Is Opus Dei has been translated into several languages and published worldwide.

In 2008, Noam Friedlander was shot in the back by a sniper while walking down the street in Los Angeles and wrote about it for The Guardian. While in LA, Friedlander has been writing extensively for Stella, the Sunday supplement of The Sunday Telegraph interviewing celebrities such as Diane Kruger, Rose Byrne, Chelsea Handler, Kelly Reilly, Amanda Seyfried and Drew Barrymore. In 2015, she interviewed Salma Hayek for the cover of the deluxe edition of ES magazine (part of the Evening Standard).

Due to her prolific writing career, Friedlander is also a member of the Authors Guild, America's leading advocate for writers' interests. In 2011, Friedlander set up a film production company to champion independent films. She has taken part in a number of 'story telling' shows while living in Los Angeles including Anna David's show True Tales of Lust and Love and the famed Write Club event at the Bootleg Theater in Los Angeles.

In November 2012, Friedlander's best-selling biography of Katy Perry was published in both Europe and the United States.

In June 2017, Noam Friedlander wrote and performed a one-woman show at the Hollywood Fringe Festival at Studio C @ The Asylum Theater. The show, 'Behind The Pulpit', featured stories about her father Rabbi Albert Friedlander. The show was sold out for all of its performances.

Noam supports Queens Park Rangers.

Selected bibliography
 Katy Perry, November 2012
 What Is Opus Dei, July 2005.
 The Paragon Book of Babies Names, May 2001.
 The Mammoth Book of Sports, June 1999.
 Sophie: A Royal Wedding Souvenir, May 1999. A biography of The Countess of Wessex.
 Heroes: Ryan Giggs, June 1997. HarperCollins. (Under pseudonym)
 Heroes: David Seaman, June 1997. HarperCollins. (Introduction, as Noam Friedlander)
 Heroes: David Beckham, June 1997. HarperCollins. (Under pseudonym)

External links
Amazon book list
Times article on Opus Dei

 Article on Geena Davis
Article in the Guardian
Official site
Article in the Guardian
First Person Article in the Guardian
Authors Guild
Friedlander Films
Katy Perry book
True Tales of Lust And Love LA Weekly

References

British writers
Year of birth missing (living people)
Living people
Alumni of the University of Edinburgh